Bartholomew Sikes (died 1803) was an officer in the employ of HM Excise who in the late 18th century perfected a device by which the alcoholic content of a liquid can be measured. The success of the device caused his name to be immortalised in an Act of Parliament: Sikes' Hydrometer Act 1816, 56 Geo. III c. 140. From 1816 until 1980 the hydrometer was the standard used in the UK to measure the alcohol proof of spirits, and from 1846 in Canadian law.

References

Bibliography

British scientific instrument makers
1803 deaths
1816 in British law
1846 in Canadian law
1846 in Canada